The Bram Stoker Award for Best Work for Young Readers is a discontinued award presented by the Horror Writers Association (HWA) for "superior achievement" in horror writing for young readers.

Winners and nominees
Nominees are listed below the winner(s) for each year.

References

Young Readers
American children's literary awards
Awards established in 1998
Awards disestablished in 2004
Bram Stoker Award for Best Work for Young Readers winners